Yuvika Tomar (born 6 July 2001) is an Indian sport shooter. She won the gold medal in 2022 National Games of India in 10 M Air Pistol. She is the first female shooter representing her state to win a gold medal at the National games. She received many medals and awards while representing India as an international shooter. In 2019 at Doha (Qatar) she represented India as junior woman shooter and received a silver medal in Asian Shooting Championship, an event of ISSF.

Early life 
Tomar was born in Arifpur Kheri, a village of western UP situated in the district of Baghpat. She comes from a family of marginal farmers in the sugarcane belt of Yamuna-Gangatic plains of North India. Her father, Sh. Kiranpal Tomar, was paralyzed as she started her shooting carrier. At  Aryangateways Sports Foundation, in 2017, she chose Amit Sheoran as her coach. She wants to maintain the legacy of the foundation’s  Olympic shooters Deepender Singh and Arjun awardee Saurabh Chaudhary.

Notable Performance 
 ISSF world cup 2022, Korea Yuvika Tomar got Silver medal.
 All India university games, 2022 Yuvika grabbed Gold Medal.
 Khelo India University Games,  2022 Bhopal GOLD Medal.
 2022 National Games of India at Ahmadabad, Gujrat she got the GOLD Medal.

See also 

National Rifle Association of India (NRAI)
 International Shooting Sports Federation (ISSF)
 Sports Authoruity of India (SAI)

References

External links 
 Aryangateways Sports Foundation (AGSF)
 Uttar Pradesh State Rifle Association (UPSRA)

Khelo India
ISSF pistol shooters
2001 births
Living people